Fane is a surname.

Notable people with the surname include

 Charles Fane de Salis (1860–1942), Bishop of Taunton from 1911 to 1930
 Sir Charles George Fane (1837–1909), British Admiral
 David Fane (born 1966), New Zealand actor
 Sir Edmund Fane (1837–1900), English diplomat, minister plenipotentiary to Denmark
 Elizabeth Fane (1510–1568), English writer and literary patron
 Sir Francis Fane (Royalist) (1611–1681) of Fulbeck (c. , supported the Royalist cause During the English Civil War
 Sir Francis Fane (dramatist) (died 1691) of Fulbeck, Restoration play write
 Francis Fane (disambiguation) (1700–1759), Tory MP and attorney general to the Prince of Wales
 Francis Fane (soldier) (1824–1893), British Colonel who raised the Peshawar Light Horse
 Francis Fane of Brympton (died 1757), Member of Parliament
 Francis Fane of Spettisbury (1752–1813), Member of Parliament
 Francis Fane (Royal Navy officer) (1778–1844), Rear-Admiral in the British Royal Navy during the Napoleonic Wars
 Frank Fane (1897–1980), farmer, World War I era soldier, and politician
 Frederick Fane (1875–1960), Irish born cricketer, who captained England on five occasions
 Sir George Fane (of Burston) (1581–1640), English politician
 George Fane (1616–1663), Civil War royalist officer and member of parliament
 Georgiana Fane (1801–1874), English heiress
 Harriet Arbuthnot (1793–1834), née Fane, was an early 19th-century English diarist, social observer and political hostess on behalf of the Tory party
 Henry Fane (died 1706) (c. 1650 – 1706), Whig Member of Parliament for Reading in 1689, 1690 and 16951689–1698. Irish Privy Councillor from 1690 until his death
 Henry Fane (1739–1802) of Fulbeck (1739–1802) Member of Parliament for Lyme Regis 1772–1802
 Sir Henry Fane (British Army officer) (1778–1840), of Fulbeck commanded brigades during several battles during the Peninsular War, and served both as a member of Parliament and Commander-in-Chief of India
 Henry Fane of Brympton (1669–1726), Bristol Privateer a great-grandson of Francis Fane, 1st Earl of Westmorland and father of Thomas Fane, 8th Earl of Westmorland
 Henry Fane of Wormsley (1703–1777), one of the chief clerks of the board of treasury, one of the chief clerks to the Privy Council, and a Member of Parliament
 Henry Hamlyn-Fane (1817–1868), known as Henry Fane until 1861, was a British soldier and Conservative politician
 Lt-Col Henry Sutton Fane (born 1805), English soldier and politician
 Sir John Fane, captain at the battle of Poitiers 1356 who captured King John II of France
 John Fane (1751–1824) (1751–1824), British Tory politician
 John Fane (1775–1850) (1775–1850), MP and British Tory politician
 John Fane (1804–1875) (1804–1875), Colonel in the British Army and a Conservative politician
 John Ponsonby-Fane (1848–1916), English cricketer and malacologist
 Julian Henry Charles Fane (1827–1870), diplomatist and poet
 Margaret Fane (1887–1962), Australian novelist and poet
 Lady Mary Fane (1639–1681),  daughter of Mildmay Fane, 2nd Earl of Westmorland
 Mildmay Fane, 2nd Earl of Westmorland (1602–1666), English nobleman, politician, and writer
 Mildmay Fane (1689–1715), English politician
 Mildmay Fane (1689–1715), British General
 Priscilla Fane, Countess of Westmorland (1793–1879), British linguist and artist
 Sir Ralph Fane or Vane of Badsel Manor (died 1552), English nobleman was executed at Tower Hill in 1552
 Richard Ponsonby-Fane (1878–1937), British academic, author, and Japanologist
 Robert George Cecil Fane (1796–1864), British Judge
 Sarah Villiers, Countess of Jersey (1785–1867),  English noblewoman, the daughter of John Fane, 10th Earl of Westmorland and Sarah Anne Child. Inherited a share in a bank
 Sir Spencer Ponsonby-Fane (1824–1915), of Brymton, diplomat, cortier and cricketer
 Sybil Fane, Countess of Westmorland (1871–1910),  socialite and member of the British aristocracy
 Sir Thomas Fane (died 1589) (died 1589), MP, convicted of treason and involvement in the Wyatt's rebellion pardoned and married to Mary Neville, Baroness le Despencer daughter of Henry Nevill, 6th Baron Bergavenny. Father of Francis Fane, 1st Earl of Westmorland
 Sir Thomas Fane (died 1692) (1626–1692), Member of Parliament for Maidstone
 Thomas Fane (1760–1807), Member of Parliament for Lyme Regis
 Vere Fane, Tory MP for Petersfield and Lyme Regis
 Sir Vere Bonamy Fane (1863–1924), General in the British Indian Army
 Vere Fane Benett-Stanford (1840–1894), Conservative MP Shaftesbury
 Violet Fane (1843–1905), British novelist, poet and essayist of Victorian era
 Walter Fane (1828–1885), British general who raised Fane's Horse at Cawnpore in 1860
 William Vere Reeve King-Fane (1868–1943) of Fulbeck OBE was a member of the Fane family, an English landowner, soldier and High Sheriff of Lincolnshire

Disambiguation pages
 Anthony Fane (disambiguation)
 Charles Fane (disambiguation)
 Dorothy Fane (disambiguation)
 Sir Francis Fane of Fulbeck (disambiguation), disambiguation page
 Henry Fane (disambiguation), disambiguation page
 John Fane (disambiguation), disambiguation page
 Julian Fane (disambiguation)
 Thomas Fane (disambiguation), disambiguation page
 Vere Fane (disambiguation), disambiguation page

English Viscount and Earls of Westmorland
 Francis Fane, 1st Earl of Westmorland (1580–1629)
 Mildmay Fane, 2nd Earl of Westmorland (1602–1666)
 Charles Fane, 3rd Earl of Westmorland (1635–1691)
 Vere Fane, 4th Earl of Westmorland (1645–1693)
 Vere Fane, 5th Earl of Westmorland (1678–1698)
 Thomas Fane, 6th Earl of Westmorland (1681–1736)
 John Fane, 7th Earl of Westmorland (1685–1762)
 Thomas Fane, 8th Earl of Westmorland (1701–1771)
 John Fane, 9th Earl of Westmorland (1728–1774)
 John Fane, 10th Earl of Westmorland (1759–1841)
 John Fane, 11th Earl of Westmorland (1784–1859)
 Francis Fane, 12th Earl of Westmorland (1825–1891)
 Anthony Mildmay Julian Fane, 13th Earl of Westmorland
 Vere Fane, 14th Earl of Westmorland (1893–1948)
 David Fane, 15th Earl of Westmorland (1924–1993)
 Anthony David Francis Henry Fane, 16th Earl of Westmorland (born 1951)
 Sarah Fane, Countess of Westmorland (1764–1793)

Irish viscount
 Viscount Fane (of Basildon in Berkshire; Loughgur in Limerick; Clare in Armagh, and parts of Devon)
 Charles Fane, 1st Viscount Fane (1676–1744)
 Charles Fane, 2nd Viscount Fane (1708–1766)

See also 
 Fane (disambiguation)

Notes